The National Specialist Contractors' Council (NSCC) was a United Kingdom construction organisation comprising 32 specialist trade associations. In September 2015, it merged with the UK Contractors Group to form Build UK.

The NSCC represented companies involved in planning, design, construction, refurbishment and maintenance of the built environment, on the Strategic Forum for Construction, alongside the Specialist Engineering Contractors Group. It was a member of the Joint Contracts Tribunal.

Members

References

External links
 SEC group web page

Construction trade groups based in the United Kingdom
Engineering organizations
Organizations disestablished in 2015
2015 disestablishments in the United Kingdom